The 2020 CONCACAF Women's Olympic Qualifying Championship was the fifth edition of the CONCACAF Women's Olympic Qualifying Tournament, the quadrennial international football tournament organized by CONCACAF to determine which women's national teams from the North, Central American and Caribbean region qualify for the Olympic football tournament. CONCACAF announced on 5 November 2019 that the United States would host the tournament between 28 January to 9 February 2020.

The top two teams qualified for the 2020 Summer Olympics women's football tournament in Japan as the CONCACAF representatives. The United States were the defending champions.

Qualification

The eight berths were allocated to the three regional zones as follows:
Three teams from the North American Zone (NAFU), i.e., Canada, Mexico and the United States, who all qualified automatically as the only teams in the region.
Two teams from the Central American Zone (UNCAF)
Three teams from the Caribbean Zone (CFU)

Regional qualification tournaments were held in Central America and Caribbean to determine the five teams joining Canada, Mexico and the United States at the final tournament.

Qualified teams
The following eight teams qualified for the final tournament.

Venues
The three venues were announced during the draw ceremony on 7 November 2019.

 Group A: BBVA Stadium, Houston, Texas
 Group B: H-E-B Park, Edinburg, Texas
 Semi-finals and final: Dignity Health Sports Park, Carson, California

Draw
The draw for the tournament took place on 7 November 2019, 14:30 EST (UTC−5), at the Mediapro Studio in Miami, Florida, United States.

The eight teams were drawn into two groups of four teams. The teams were seeded into four pots for the draw. Pot 1 contained the United States, seeded in Group A as the host nation. The remaining teams were allocated to the pots based on the FIFA Women's World Rankings of 27 September 2019 (shown in parentheses below).

Squads

Group stage
The top two teams from each group advance to the semi-finals.

All times are local, CST (UTC−6).

Tiebreakers
The ranking of teams in the group stage was determined as follows:
 Points obtained in all group matches (three points for a win, one for a draw, none for a defeat);
 Goal difference in all group matches;
 Number of goals scored in all group matches;
 Drawing of lots.

Group A

Group B

Knockout stage
All times are local, PST (UTC−8).

Bracket

Semi-finals
The semi-final winners qualified for the 2020 Summer Olympics.

Final

Goalscorers

Awards
The following awards were given at the conclusion of the tournament.

CONCACAF also released a "Best XI" of the tournament.

Qualified teams for Summer Olympics
The following two teams from CONCACAF qualified for the 2020 Summer Olympic women's football tournament.

1 Bold indicates champions for that year. Italic indicates hosts for that year.

Controversy 
 In the 19th minute of the group stage match between the United States and Haiti, Haiti's Roseline Éloissaint scored a header from a corner kick. However, the assistant referee signalled that Éloissaint was at an offside position, and Éloissaint's goal was subsequently disallowed. According to the Laws of the Game, there was no offside offense since Éloissaint received the ball directly from a corner kick.

References

External links
Concacaf Women's Olympic Qualifying, CONCACAF.com

 
2019
Olympic Qualifying Championship, Women's
Football at the 2020 Summer Olympics – Women's qualification
2020 in women's association football
Olympic Qualifying Championship, Women's
2020 CONCACAF Women's Olympic Qualifying Championship
January 2020 sports events in the United States
February 2020 sports events in the United States